"More than Friends" is a 2017 song by James Hype featuring Kelli-Leigh, it was released by Warner Music on 7 July 2017 and peaked at number 8 in the United Kingdom. The song is a remake of En Vogue's 1996 song "Don't Let Go (Love)", rearranging lines from the track into a new order.

Track listing

Digital download

Digital download EP

Charts

Weekly charts

Year-end charts

Certifications

Release history

References

2017 debut singles
2017 songs
British electronic dance music songs
British house music songs
James Hype songs
Song recordings produced by James Hype
Songs written by Andrea Martin (musician)
Songs written by Ivan Matias